Brian Negro (born 8 September 1997) is an Argentine professional footballer who plays as a left-back for Acassuso.

Club career
He began his career at Club Social y Deportivo Talleres, where he was playing until the age of 15. In January 2014, he was transferred to Club Atlético Patronato where he was playing for 3 years in the youth league and became a part of the first team squad in August 2017 until the present.

Negro made his professional debut with Patronato in a 1-0 Argentine Primera División loss to Vélez Sarsfield on 9 December 2019.

Personal life 
Brian Lionel Negro was born on 8 September 1997 in Bovril, Province of Entre Rios, the first of the four children of Nestor Negro, a steel transport fleet manager, and his wife Edith Maricel Schaffer, who works in a clothing workshop. On his father's side, he is Argentinian descent, and on his mother's side, he has primarily German ancestry. Growing up in a tight-knit, football-environment, Brian developed a passion for the sport from an early age, playing at home with his older cousins and neighbours in a small village called Federal. At the age of eight he joined local club, Club Social y Deportivo Talleres where he played until the age of 15.

Moving from his home town to the bigger city of Parana, Entre Rios, Brian enrolled at Patronato's youth academy at age of 15.

After two years at Patronato's youth academy, he was promoted to the reserve team and a year after to the first team, where he signed his first professional contract on 1 August 2017.

Career statistics

Gallery

References

External links

1997 births
Living people
Sportspeople from Entre Ríos Province
Argentine footballers
Association football defenders
Argentine Primera División players
Torneo Federal A players
Club Atlético Patronato footballers
Club Atlético Paraná players
Sarmiento de Resistencia footballers
Club Atlético Acassuso footballers